Mahipalpur is an urban village, located in New Delhi district of Delhi, India. It is located near the Indira Gandhi International Airport. Delhi Aerocity metro station is the nearest metro station.

History 
The village dates back to the 11th century, and is named after a Tomar ruler named Mahipal. The area around the village has been inhabited since earlier. For example, the Sultan Ghari monument was built in around 10th century by gurjur pratihara dynasty. During the 17th century people from the nearby malikpur migrated here and removed the local people.

See also 
 Vasant Kunj
 Delhi Aerocity metro station

References 

South West Delhi district
Villages in South Delhi district
Neighbourhoods in Delhi